Oscar Motuloh was born on 17 August 1959 in Surabaya, East Java. He started his journalism career as a reporter at Antara (Indonesian News Agency) in 1988. Two years later he was assigned to the Press Photo Division and directed that division (1990-2009). He teaches photojournalism across Indonesia. On 18 September 2019, He was awarded Empu Ageng (equivalent to Doctor Honoris Causa) from Indonesia Institute of The Arts, Yogyakarta.

References 

1959 births
Living people
Indonesian photographers
Indonesian journalists